Deadly Dozen: Pacific Theater is a World War II oriented squad-based first-person shooter developed by nFusion Interactive and is the sequel to Deadly Dozen.

Gameplay
Unlike its predecessor, it is set in the Pacific theater and most of its levels take place in large outdoor areas. Other than regular infantry combat, the game also features drivable vehicles.

Reception

Deadly Dozen: Pacific Theater received positive reviews from critics upon release, in contrast with the previous game's mixed reception. On Metacritic, the game holds a score of 78/100 based on 8 reviews, indicating "generally favorable reviews". On GameRankings, the game holds a score of 78.40% based on 10 reviews.

Deadly Dozen was a runner-up for GameSpots annual "Best Budget Game on PC" award, which went to Serious Sam: The Second Encounter.

Re-release and remaster
In July 2013, Tommo purchased many assets from Atari during their bankruptcy sale, including Deadly Dozen: Pacific Theater. The company later re-released it on Steam under their "Retroism" brand in 2015. In March 2020, the ownership of the title, alongside other Retroism games, was transferred over to the newly formed Ziggurat Interactive, who currently publish the game.

References

External links
 Deadly Dozen: Pacific Theater at N-Fusion.com
 Deadly Dozen: Pacific Theater at Atari.com
 

2002 video games
Tactical shooter video games
Video game sequels
Video games developed in the United States
Video games set in Alaska
Video games set in Japan
Video games set in Kiribati
Video games set in Myanmar
Video games set in the Northern Mariana Islands
Video games set in Okinawa Prefecture
Video games set in Papua New Guinea
Video games set in the Philippines
Video games set in the Solomon Islands
Windows games
Windows-only games
World War II first-person shooters
Pacific War video games
Tommo games